Club Deportivo Subiza is a Spanish football team based in Subiza, Galar in the autonomous community of Navarre. Founded in 1984, it plays in Tercera División RFEF – Group 15, playing their home matches at the Estadio Sotoburu, with a capacity of 1,000 people.

History
Founded in 1984, Subiza started a senior team in 1993, and achieved their first-ever promotion to the Tercera División in 2002. On 15 June 2020, the club reached an agreement with CA Osasuna to become their second reserve team, behind CA Osasuna B.

Season to season

As an independent team

As a reserve team

10 seasons in Tercera División
1 season in Tercera División RFEF

References

External links
Soccerway team profile

CA Osasuna
Football clubs in Navarre
Association football clubs established in 1984
1984 establishments in Spain